Kim Min-seo (born April 9, 1996), known mononymously as Minseo, is a South Korean singer and actress. She was selected as part of the Top 8 on Superstar K 7. She made her official debut in 2018 with "Wonderful Dream".

Early life and education 
Minseo was born on April 9, 1996. She liked to sing, joining a children's choir and participating in various children's song festivals. She spent her childhood in difficult financial circumstances after middle school. Since she was 15, she prepared to be in a girl group with Eunha, SinB, and others. However, Minseo left the company when she was 18. 

Minseo graduated from the Practical Music Department at Ahyeon Industrial Information School. In 2015, Minseo entered the Practical Music Department of Hanyang Women's University. She attended college under the aid of a national scholarship but took a leave of absence for economic reasons.

Career

2015–2017: Pre-debut: Superstar K 7, "Monthly Yoon Jong-shin" 
In 2015, Minseo participated in Superstar K 7. On August 20, the Superstar K 7 pre-release video was released and Minseo received public attention. In the preliminaries, Minseo passed with positive reviews from judges Yoon Jong-shin, Baek Ji-young and Ailee, saying "you really seem like a female winner candidate." In the first round, she sang Park Ji-yoon's "Fantasy" alongside Yoo Yu-min and Lee Ji-hee and was eliminated. However, after she was eliminated, she was passed by the judges. Minseo sang IU's "The Story Only I Didn't Know" with Gil Min-ji, passing and advancing to the live broadcast finals. Minseo advanced past the Top 10 stage with Kang Susie's "Scattered Days". For the Top 8 stage, she sang Jang Deok's "Girl and Street Light" and was eliminated. After she was eliminated, she was offered the main vocalist position in a girl group from a number of agencies. She was also offered an appearance on Produce 101. 

On May 27, 2016, Minseo signed an exclusive contract with Apop, a music label under Mystic Story. On June 3, Minseo released the single "The Sound of You Coming" for The Handmaiden with labelmate Gain. On October 14, singer Yoon Jong-shin announced through his Instagram account that Minseo would participate in Mystic Entertainment's music project "Monthly Yoon Jong-shin". At midnight on October 18, Minseo released "2016 Monthly Yoon Jong Shin October Issue" with Yoon. She was also selected for the music video of the title track "First" with Joo Woo-jae and tried acting for the first time. On November 23, Yoon announced that Minseo would participate in "Monthly Yoon Jong-shin" again, marking the first time a singer had participated in the project for two months in a row. Regarding this, Minseo expressed her feelings through her Instagram account, "I was able to work on 'Monthly Yoon Jong-shin' once more. I was so honored and happy to be able to work consecutively." On the same day, Minseo released a motion poster for "Monthly Yoon Jong-shin November 2016". On November 25, Minseo released a photo of her working with photographer Kim Joong-man before the release of her new single. Regarding Min-seo, Kim Joong-man said, "In Min-seo, who has tangled hair, a thoughtful expression and gaze, and tightly closed lips, the image of a heroine of tragedy, and in Min-seo, who looks straight ahead with her hair tied up and her shoulder line exposed, the image of an unadorned and innocent woman. You can see it.” At midnight on November 27, Minseo and Yoon released "2016 Monthly Yoon Jong-shin November Issue". Minseo was also selected as the main character in the music video for the title song "You Who Loved You". On the same day, Minseo sang "The Missing Girl" at Yoon's concert "Lyricist Yoon Jong-shin Concert Special Lecture 2nd Class" at Samsung Hall, Ewha Womans University. 

On November 6, 2017, Minseo announced that she would release her debut album. Her debut album was produced by producer Jo Young-cheol. On November 15, Minseo announced that she would be participating in Yoon's "Monthly Yoon Jong-shin November 2017". The title song "Yes" is known as the answer to "LISTEN 010 Do you like it" released by Yoon on June 22. "Yes" ranked first on real-time charts such as Melon and Genie for about two weeks after its release. Minseo was also nominated for first place in Music Bank, Music Core, and Inkigayo before her official debut. On December 1, Minseo appeared on a live music broadcast for the first time through Music Bank. Minseo received two music show wins on Inkigayo on December 3 and Music Bank on December 8.

2018–present: The Diary of Youth 
On February 14, 2018, Mystic Entertainment announced that Minseo's debut schedule had been postponed to early March. The reason for postponement was revealed to have been the success of "Yes". Minseo expressed her feelings before releasing her debut album, "I will be able to meet my unique voice and music." On February 23, Minseo released the name and release date of The Diary of Youth and the name of the title track "Wonderful Dream". Mystic Entertainment said that Minseo's album contains the meaning that Minseo, who represents youth in her 20s, writes a consensus of youth through four diaries. On February 26, Minseo announced that she would release four songs sequentially, starting with title track "Wonderful Dream"; it was also revealed that "Wonderful Dream" is a song that contains the fresh excitement that a woman who learned love through writing feels for the first time. On February 28, Minseo revealed that composer Lee Min-soo and lyricist Kim Eana will participate in the title track. On March 6, Minseo made her debut with the release of her first single "Wonderful Dream" from The Diary of Youth.

Discography

Extended plays

Singles

Filmography

Television series

Television programs

Music video appearances

Awards and nominations

Notes

References

External links 

South Korean women singers
South Korean actresses
1996 births
Living people